The Devil's Chair are urban legends about funerary or memorial sculpture in cemeteries.

Devil's Chair may also refer to:

Places
 Devil's Chair (Shropshire), a geologic formation in the Stiperstones, Shropshire, England
 Silla del Diablo, a geologic formation within the Cueva del Milodón Natural Monument in Patagonian Chile
 Devil's Chair, a destroyed geologic formation in the Interstate Parks on the Minnesota-Wisconsin border, US
 Devil's Chair, a rock formation in Collonges-la-Rouge, France

Other uses
 The Devil's Chair, a 2007 British film